It was the first edition of the Eurocard Classics.
Guy Forget and Jakob Hlasek won the inaugural doubles title, defeating Michael Mortensen and Tom Nijssen 6–3, 6–2 in the final.

Seeds

  Tim Pawsat /  Laurie Warder (first round)
  Javier Sánchez /  Goran Ivanišević (first round)
  Mansour Bahrami /  Éric Winogradsky (quarterfinals)
  Sergio Casal /  Emilio Sánchez (first round)

Draw

Draw

References
General

Eurocard Open
Eurocard Classics